is a former Japanese football player.

Playing career
Hirajima was born in Sakai on February 3, 1982. After graduating from high school, he joined J1 League club Avispa Fukuoka in 2000. He played many matches as regular right side back in the first season. However he was arrested on charges of violating child pornography laws in late 2001 and his player registration was deleted in 2002. The club results were also bad in 2001 and it was relegated to the J2 League in 2002. He returned as a player in 2003. Although he could not play many matches in 2003, he became a regular player as right side back again in 2004. However he could hardly play in the match in 2005. Although the club was promoted to J1 from 2006, he was released from the club at the end of the 2006 season. In 2007, he moved to J2 club Kyoto Sanga FC. He became a regular player and the club was promoted to J1 in 2008. In July 2008, he moved to the J2 club Cerezo Osaka. He played many matches as right side back until 2009 and the club was promoted to J1 at the end of the 2009 season. In 2010, he moved to the J2 club Tokushima Vortis and became a regular player. However his opportunity to play decreased in 2011. In 2013, he moved to the Japan Football League club AC Nagano Parceiro. Although the club won the championship and was promoted to the new J3 League in 2014, he retired at the end of the 2013 season.

Club statistics

References

External links

1982 births
Living people
Association football people from Osaka Prefecture
Japanese footballers
J1 League players
J2 League players
Japan Football League players
Avispa Fukuoka players
Kyoto Sanga FC players
Cerezo Osaka players
Tokushima Vortis players
AC Nagano Parceiro players
Association football defenders
People from Sakai, Osaka